"Westerland" is a punk song by German band Die Ärzte. It was the fifth track and the second single from their 1988 album Das ist nicht die ganze Wahrheit.... It is an ironic ode to the city of Westerland. It was also released on Die Ärzte's first maxi single, which had the same cover as the single but tracks different from the maxi LP. "Westerland (Kommerzmix)" was later put on "Das Beste von kurz nach früher bis jetze".

The song has been covered by Die Toten Hosen in a concert.

Personnel
Farin Urlaub - vocals, guitar, bass
Bela B. - drums

Track listing 
 "Westerland" - 3:40
 "Westerland (Live-Version)" - 3:07

Maxi 
 "Westerland (Kommerzmix)" - 9:54
 "Westerland (Live-Version)" - 3:07
 "Westerland (Extended Ganja)" - 4:47

Maxi-CD 
 "Westerland" (Urlaub) - 3:40
 "Westerland (Live-Version)" (Urlaub) - 3:07
 "♀" (Urlaub) - 1:47

B-sides 
"♀" was also taken from "Das ist nicht die ganze Wahrheit...".

Charts

Certifications

References

1988 singles
Die Ärzte songs
Songs written by Farin Urlaub
1988 songs
CBS Records singles